Teffont Evias Quarry and Lane Cutting is a 3.6 hectare geological Site of Special Scientific Interest at Teffont Evias in Wiltshire, England, notified in 1989. It consists of two parts, Teffont Evias Quarry, and Teffont Evias Lane Cutting. Forest trees are currently growing on both sites, but there are small accessible exposures on the sides of quarry and roadway cuttings.

The sites offer exposures of a mid-Purbeck Lagerstätte, fine-grained limestone rock with good conditions for fossilization. These rocks and fossils were deposited after shallow seas receded about 146 million years ago. They record a warm environment of lakes and coastal lagoons, with occasional marine transgressions such as the Cinder Bed. Large fossils are rare, but they include insects of at least four Orders, fish, and crocodilians, also remains of vegetation, including a large tree and Charales. The charophytes, Clavator reidi, may have grown in a lake 1-2m deep or somewhat more.

Teffont Evias Quarry
This includes a pit with a recorded section from the early Jurassic Lias Group up to the Cinder Bed (formerly identified as the boundary between Jurassic and Cretaceous rocks, now regarded as early Cretaceous). With a wealth of fossils this is one of the most important Purbeck Bed localities outside Dorset.

Teffont Evias Lane Cutting
This is a key site in the history of British palaeoentomology; it has produced rare, but well-preserved insects and is the best exposure of the Purbeck beds (Lower Cretaceous, Berriasian c. 144 Ma) for collecting fossil insects. These beds formed the main material for Peter Bellinger Brodie's "Insects in the Secondary Rocks of England", a seminal work and still significant today.

References

External links
 Location of the SSSI on Natural England's interactive map

Sites of Special Scientific Interest in Wiltshire
Sites of Special Scientific Interest notified in 1989
Quarries in Wiltshire